Hypatopa morrisoni is a moth in the family Blastobasidae. It is found in the United States, including Arizona.

The wingspan is about 17 mm. The forewings are bone-white, with grayish brown suffusion. The hindwings are shining pale brownish gray.

References

Moths described in 1907
Hypatopa